Characteristic (floating point number) may refer to:

 Characteristic (biased exponent), an (ambiguous) term formerly used by some authors to specify some type of exponent of a floating point number
 Characteristic (significand), an (ambiguous) term formerly used by some authors to specify the significand of a floating point number

See also
 Characteristic (exponent notation)
 Characteristic (logarithm)
 Characteristic (disambiguation)